Mitev is a Bulgarian masculine surname, its feminine counterpart is Miteva. It may refer to
Boban Mitev (born 1972), Macedonian basketball coach
Danail Mitev (born 1984), Bulgarian football player
Ivan Mitev (1924–2007), Bulgarian pediatrician and cardio rheumatologist 
Konstantin Mitev (born 1984), Bulgarian volleyball player
Silvia Miteva (born 1986), Bulgarian rhythmic gymnast
Stanimir Mitev (born 1985), Bulgarian football player
Vanio Mitev (born 1954), Bulgarian medical scientist 
Viktor Mitev (born 1992), Bulgarian football player
Zdravko Mitev (born 1944), Bulgarian football player

See also
Mitev Glacier in Antarctica

Bulgarian-language surnames